For Alto is a jazz double-LP by composer/multi-reedist Anthony Braxton, recorded in 1969 and released on  Delmark Records in 1971. Braxton performs the pieces on this album entirely on alto saxophone, with no additional musicians, instrumentation or overdubbing. Although other jazz musicians, such as Coleman Hawkins, Sonny Rollins, and Eric Dolphy, had recorded unaccompanied saxophone solos, For Alto was the first jazz album composed solely of solo saxophone music.

Background
According to Braxton, For Alto came about as a result of his fascination with the solo piano music of Arnold Schoenberg, Fats Waller, and Karlheinz Stockhausen. However, feeling that his skills on the piano were inadequate, he decided to create "a particular language for the saxophone." He also cited the experience of a 1967 improvised solo saxophone concert during which he ran out of ideas. He recalled: "I imagined I was just going to get up there and play for one hour from pure invention, but after ten minutes I'd run through all my ideas and started to repeat myself. I felt like, 'Oh my God, and there's still fifty minutes to go!'" This led to a project in which he catalogued specific, easily identifiable musical elements (for example, long sounds, trills, multiphonics, short attacks) which could then be used as "starting points or springboards to musical activity." The concept would become known as "Language Music," of which For Alto is an early example.

Braxton later stated that he recorded the music himself in the basement of the Parkway Community Center in Chicago, and that he "basically gave it to Delmark Records." Although the published liner notes consist only of a series of diagrams, he had originally intended to include a convoluted, winding essay in which, among other things, he stated: "If this record doesn't sell a million copies I will be very disappointed. Already I am making room on my mantle for a gold record and I am going to have parties and I am preparing an acceptance speech." Braxton would go on to record a number of additional solo alto saxophone albums, such as Saxophone Improvisations Series F (1972) and Alto Saxophone Improvisations 1979, and For Alto would inspire other saxophonists, such as Joe McPhee, Evan Parker, and Steve Lacy, to record their own solo albums.

Reception

Initial reaction to the album was mixed. In a June 1971 DownBeat review, Joe H. Klee called the album "revolutionary" and awarded it five stars. In that same edition of DownBeat, tenor saxophonist Harold Land was played the track, "To Artist Murry DePillars", in a Blindfold Test. Upon hearing the track, he commented: "I think that he's a very good saxophonist... I have great respect for his technique and his control of the instrument." 

Four months later, however, the magazine published a second Blindfold Test, this time with saxophonist Phil Woods, in which Woods, after listening to the same track, stated: "That was terrible, I can't imagine the ego of a person thinking they can sustain a whole performance by themselves... It's not jazzy, it's not classical... it's dull... this is such an ego trip..."

Recent reactions have been positive, and the album is now recognized as one of the landmarks of free jazz and improvised music. The AllMusic review by Thom Jurek stated: "For Alto is one of the greatest solo saxophone records ever made, and maybe one of the greatest recordings ever issued, period".
The Penguin Guide to Jazz gives For Alto a four-star rating (of a possible four) along with its "crown" token of merit, and describes it as "one of the genuinely important American recordings.  While some landmark performances retain only a mystical aura of their original significance, [For Alto] remains powerfully listenable and endlessly fascinating."

On All About Jazz Derek Taylor observed "This is a recording and artistic statement that completely changed the rules. Braxton's gall seemed audacious to some, but revolutionary to far more and the hindsight of history has proven this latter camp correct. His opened the gates for solo improvisatory expression for all players up to the challenge to pass through and in the intervening years many of the giants of improvised music have followed suit".

Author Tom Moon included the album in his book 1,000 Recordings to Hear Before You Die, writing: "For Alto is dizzying and maddening, dense and challenging, inventive and offputting. It's also among a handful of great solo saxophone recordings in jazz, alongside the unaccompanied tunes on Eric Dolphy's Far Cry. The sheer amount of music here is overwhelming... For Alto is a riveting blast of fresh air, radically adventurous early gems from one of the most important thinkers in jazz."

In an article for Jazzwise, Kevin Le Gendre stated: "Braxton's alto saxophone is like the sound of acid dripped from the beating wings of hummingbirds, a charmingly corrosive caress. Through brilliant dynamics, lyricism, harmonic invention and pure sound trickery, Braxton showed a single horn could be a complete orchestra."

Nate Wooley, writing for Sound American, commented: "a series of solo compositions are presented based roughly on the different language types, and it is a fascinating document of the concept, while also being an enjoyably rigorous example of his mastery of the alto saxophone... In each piece, Braxton very clearly, almost obsessively, works with one language type, exhausting its permutations finally before moving to the next."

Track listing
 "Dedicated to Multi-Instrumentalist Jack Gell"  – 0:42
 "To Composer John Cage"  – 9:30
 "To Artist Murry DePillars"  – 4:17
 "To Pianist Cecil Taylor"  – 5:18
 "Dedicated to Ann and Peter Allen"  – 12:54
 "Dedicated to Susan Axelrod"  – 10:24
 "To My Friend Kenny McKenny"  – 10:06
 "Dedicated to Multi-Instrumentalist Leroy Jenkins"  – 19:47

Personnel
Anthony Braxton - alto saxophone

References

External links
Anthony Braxton's For Alto Liner Notes, accessed November 4, 2016

1970 albums
Anthony Braxton albums
Delmark Records albums